Reuven Niemeijer (born 27 March 1995) is a Dutch professional footballer who plays as a midfielder for Italian  club Brescia.

Club career
Niemeijer made his professional debut in the Eredivisie for Heracles Almelo on 2 December 2016 in a game against N.E.C.

On 1 July 2020, he moved to SBV Excelsior.

On 1 July 2022, Niemeijer signed with Brescia in Italy.

References

External links
 

Living people
1995 births
Sportspeople from Hengelo
Association football midfielders
Dutch footballers
Heracles Almelo players
FC Emmen players
Quick '20 players
Excelsior Rotterdam players
Brescia Calcio players
Eredivisie players
Eerste Divisie players
Dutch expatriate footballers
Expatriate footballers in Italy
Dutch expatriate sportspeople in Italy
Footballers from Overijssel